Gregory may refer to:

People and fictional characters
 Gregory (given name), including a list of people and fictional characters with the given name
 Gregory (surname), a surname

Places

Australia 
Gregory, Queensland, a town in the Shire of Burke
Electoral district of Gregory, Queensland, Australia
Gregory, Western Australia.

United States 
Gregory, South Dakota
Gregory, Tennessee
Gregory, Texas

Outer space 
Gregory (lunar crater)
Gregory (crater on Venus)

Other uses
 "Gregory" (The Americans), the third episode of the first season of the television series The Americans

See also
 Greg (disambiguation)
 Greggory
 Gregoire (disambiguation)
 Gregor (disambiguation)
 Gregores (disambiguation)
 Gregorian (disambiguation)
 Gregory County (disambiguation)
 Gregory Highway, Queensland
 Gregory National Park, Northern Territory
 Gregory River in the Shire of Burke, Queensland
 Justice Gregory (disambiguation)
 Lake Gregory (disambiguation)